The Importation of Contraband Case (輸入禁制品該当通知取消等請求事件), or SCOJ 2003 No.157, is a Supreme Court of Japan case that resulted in a landmark decision regarding obscenity standards in Japan.  The Court held that 1) the ban on the importation of obscene material in the Customs Tariff Law did not violate the Constitution's guarantee of freedom of expression, and 2) the photo book Mapplethorpe did not qualify as obscene under the Customs Tariff Law's definition of obscenity.  The case was brought on appeal from a 2003 decision by the Tokyo High Court.

History of case

Mapplethorpe was originally published in Japan by Random House in 1994 without objection from the authorities.  However, in 1999 a copy of the book was confiscated from Mr. Takahashi Asai by airport customs officials at Narita Airport.

Supreme Court decision

Justice Kohei Nasu wrote that the 384-page volume of black-and-white portraits, including 20 close-ups of male genitalia, “compiles work from the artistic point of view, and is not obscene as a whole.”

Impact

Asai called the Supreme Court decision “groundbreaking” and said it “could change the obscenity standard” used for banning foreign films that depict nudity and for censoring photographs in books. The Court's decision was believed to be the first time the top court overruled a lower court ruling on obscenity.

Footnotes

See also
Politics of Japan
Japanese law
Judicial System of Japan
2008 Decisions of the Supreme Court of Japan

Free speech case law
Japanese case law
Obscenity law